Leszek Walankiewicz (born 18 August 1959) is a retired Polish football defender.

References

1959 births
Living people
Polish footballers
Hutnik Nowa Huta players
MKS Cracovia (football) players
Association football defenders